Tregenza is a Cornish surname. It derives from Tregenza in the parish of Creed; Tregenza is formed from the elements "tre" (homestead) and "kensyth" (meaning unknown). Tregenna, Tregensoe, Tregensowe, and Tregenzo are possibly related names.

It may refer to:
 Norman Tregenza, Republican member of the New Hampshire House of Representatives
 Robert Tregenza (born 1950), American cinematographer and film director
 Rod Tregenza (born 1979), Australian rules footballer
 Sharon Tregenza, British children's author
 Simon Tregenza (born 1971),  Australian rules footballer

Footnotes

Cornish-language surnames